Vanda Gréville (born Wanda MacEwan; 10 January 190826 December 1997) was a British film actress who mainly appeared in French productions. She was the wife of the Anglo-French director Edmond T. Gréville.

Selected filmography
 A Gentleman of Paris (1931)
 Le Bal (1931)
 Le Million (1931)
 The Train of Suicides (1931)
 Ebb Tide (1932)
 A Gentleman of the Ring (1932)
 Gold in the Street (1934)
 La Garçonne (1936)
 A Woman in the Night (1943)

References

Bibliography
 Jonathan Driskell. The French Screen Goddess: Film Stardom and the Modern Woman in 1930s France. I.B.Tauris, 2015.

External links

1908 births
1997 deaths
British film actresses
Actresses from London
People from Westgate-on-Sea